Liebling Kreuzberg is a television series on ARD, which was first aired in five seasons with a total of 58 episodes from 1986 to 1998.

The scripts of seasons one through three and five were written by Jurek Becker, who tailor-made the role of idiosyncratic Berlin Kreuzberg attorney Robert Liebling for his friend Manfred Krug, the fourth season was written by Ulrich Plenzdorf. The series was directed by Heinz Schirk (first season), Werner Masten (second to fourth season) and Vera Loebner (fifth season). It was produced by SFB, NDR and WDR. The music of the first season was composed by Hans-Martin Majewski, in the later seasons by Klaus Doldinger.

Content and Characters 

The eponymous main character, Robert Liebling (born June 12, 1939) is an attorney and notary, who has his office in Berlin's Kreuzberg district. In the first four seasons he has a three-day beard, wears a hat, drives a motorcycle (a Honda first, then a BMW) and convertibles (4th season, a Mercedes-Benz W124 series, season 5, a Mercedes-Benz W111), smokes cigar and consumes götterspeise in large amounts, which his secretaries Paula (Corinna Genest) and Senta (Anja Franke) always have to keep in stock. Sometimes Liebling has several girlfriends simultaneously, which often leads to trouble. While he does these things quite easily, he reacted with jealousy when one of his liaisons moved into the vicinity of infidelity.

As a matter of principle, Liebling only takes cases that interest him. In the first episode of the 1st Season, he explains that he has sold a real estate business inherited from his father and is now, in his capacity as a notary, documenting any resulting sales contracts. This secures him a degree of financial independence, so that he can afford to avoid work if possible. Much rather he goes for a walk during the day along the river Spree or sleeps in his office. Much of the remaining work he delegates to his associates. In the first three seasons, this is Michael Kausch in the role of Dr. Giselmund Arnold, later Jenny Gröllmann as Isolde Isenthal "Issi" and finally Stefan Reck as Dr. Bruno Pelzer. They are often idealistic, while at the same time more conventional and serve as antagonists of pragmatic, but unconventional Liebling. Most funny dialogues in the series result from this contrast. However, the contrast is often only a seeming one, because Liebling—although a cynic—has also idealistic traits.

The individual episodes usually deal with minor disputes, which often confront the layman with unexpected legal facts. In the parallel storyline favorite girlfriends are a supporting subject. In the early episodes, the relationships change most rapidly, while the suspense in later episodes is generated by the professional or personal background of the women. In the 2nd and 3rd Season it is the attorney Rosemarie Monk (Diana Körner), in the 4th Season Lena Lewandowsky (Isa Jank), in the 5th Season the married Lola Kornhaus (Monika Woytowicz) and finally Miriam Breslauer (Johanna Liebeneiner). Another important role in the private setting of the story is his chaotic and chronically broke daughter Sarah Liebling (Roswitha Schreiner), who in the final season—initially in secret—is the girlfriend of Dr. Bruno Pelzer.

Other actors 

 Corinna Genest: Paula Fink (Season 1–3, 5)
 Anja Franke: Senta Kurzweg (Season 1–5)
 Michael Kausch: Gieselmund Arnol Season (1–3)
 Stefan Reck: Bruno Pelzer (Season 5)
 Diana Körner: Rosemarie Monk (Season 2–4)
 Jenny Gröllmann: Isolde Isenthal (Season 4)
 Friedrich-Karl Praetorius: Clerk Mr Wittlich (Season 2)
 Adrian Schröck: Robertschen Liebling (Season 4–5)
 Brigitte Grothum: Erika Liebling (Season 1)
 : Bob (Season 5)
 Joachim Kemmer: Dr. Klinda (Season 4)
 Karin Hardt: Mother of Robert Liebling (Season 2)
 Hans Nitschke: Mohrenhaupt, public prosecutor (Seasons 3–4)
 Monika Woytowicz: Lola Kornhaus
 Johanna Liebeneiner: Miriam Breslauer
 Liesa Schober: Barbara Isenthal (Season 4)
 Peter Schiff: Lawyer Wolter (Season 1–5)
 Rolf Zacher: Willi Gumpert/Willi Rodegast (Season 2–4)

Seasons 

 1985/1986
 1987/1988
 1989/1990
 1993/1994
 1997/1998

Episode List

External links 
 

1986 German television series debuts
1998 German television series endings
Television shows set in Berlin
German-language television shows
Das Erste original programming
German legal television series
Grimme-Preis for fiction winners